Ashkelon may refer to:

Places
 Ashkelon, a coastal city in the South District of Israel
 Tel Ashkelon, the ancient city of Ashkelon, destroyed in 1270, and now an archaeological site

Organizations
 Ironi Ashkelon, Israeli basketball team
 Hapoel Ashkelon F.C., Israeli football club
 Hof Ashkelon Regional Council, a regional council surrounding Ashkelon, Israel
 Eilat Ashkelon Pipeline Company, an Israeli petroleum company

Schools
 Ashkelon Academic College

Other
 Ashkelon Railway Station, a railway station in Ashkelon, Israel
 The Streets of Ashkelon, a science fiction short story by Harry Harrison

See also
 Ascalon (disambiguation)